This is a list of Canadian provinces and territories by their Human Development Index, which is a comparative measure of life expectancy, literacy, education, standard of living and overall well-being of the citizens in each province and territory. All Canadian provinces and territories have a very high (greater than 0.800) HDI. The 2021 estimate merges the province and territories of Prince Edward Island, Northwest Territories, Nunavut and Yukon into one, rather than classifying them separately.

Human Development Index

See also 
 List of Canadian provinces and territories by GDP
 List of Canadian provinces and territories by life expectancy
 List of governments in Canada by annual expenditures
 List of Canadian provincial and territorial name etymologies
 Population of Canada by province and territory

References

Lists of provinces and territories of Canada
Human Development Index
Human Development Index